Stadion Dragan Nikolić, commonly known as Stadion kraj Nišave, is a multi-purpose stadium in Pirot, Serbia. Named after Dragan Nikolić, it is primarily the home venue of football clubs Jedinstvo and Radnički Pirot. The current capacity of the stadium is 13,816.

External links
 Stadium page at scpirot.rs
 Stadium page at radnicki-pirot.host.sk

Football venues in Serbia
Multi-purpose stadiums in Serbia